The 2018 Leinster Senior Hurling Championship Final, the deciding game of the 2018 Leinster Senior Hurling Championship, was a hurling match played on 1 July 2018 at Croke Park, Dublin. It was contested by Kilkenny and defending champions Galway. The first game ended in a draw with Galway winning the replay a week later. The Galway captain was David Burke and Cathal Mannion was named as the man of the match for the replay.

Build-Up
Tickets for the final went on sale on 15 June and ranged in price from €35 to €40 in the stand and €25 in hill 16.	

The drawn match and replay were shown live on RTÉ One as part of The Sunday Game Live.

The final of the 2018 Joe McDonagh Cup took place before the drawn final at Croke Park and was won by Carlow.

Match details

References

Leinster
Leinster Senior Hurling Championship Finals
Wexford GAA matches
Galway GAA matches
Leinster Senior Hurling